Nediljko "Ned" Budisa (born 21 November 1966) is a Croatian biochemist, professor and holder of the Tier 1 Canada Research Chair (CRC) for chemical synthetic biology at the University of Manitoba. As pioneer in the areas of genetic code engineering and chemical synthetic biology (Xenobiology), his research has a wide range of applications in biotechnology and engineering biology in general. Being highly interdisciplinary, it includes bioorganic and medical chemistry, structural biology, biophysics and molecular biotechnology as well as metabolic and biomaterial engineering. He is the author of the only textbook in his research field: “Engineering the genetic code: expanding the amino acid repertoire for the design of novel proteins”.

Early life, education and career

Ned Budisa earned a High school teacher diploma in Chemistry and Biology in 1990, a B.S. in Molecular Biology and MSc in Biophysics in 1993 from the University of Zagreb. He received a PhD in 1997 from the Technical University of Munich where his thesis advisor was Professor Robert Huber. He also habilitated at the Technical University of Munich in 2005 and worked afterwards as a junior group leader ("Molecular Biotechnology") at the Max Planck Institute for Biochemistry in Munich. Between 2007 and 2010 he was a member of CIPSM in Munich. He was appointed as full professor of biocatalysis at the TU Berlin in 2010 until the end of 2018, when he accepted the Tier 1 CRC position in Chemical Synthetic Biology at the University of Manitoba. Ned Budisa is also a member of the Excellence Cluster ‘Unifying Systems in Catalysis’ (UniSysCat) and keeps adjunct professor status at the TU Berlin. In 2014, he founded the first Berlin iGEM team.

Research

Ned Budisa applies the Selective Pressure Incorporation (SPI) method that enables single and multiple in vivo incorporations of synthetic (i.e. non-canonical) amino acid analogs in proteins, preferably by sense codon reassignment. His methodology allows for fine chemical manipulations of the amino acid side chains, mainly of proline, tryptophan and methionine. These experiments are often assisted with simple metabolic engineering. 
Ned's research goal is the transfer of various physicochemical properties and bioorthogonal chemistry reactions (chemoselective ligations such as click chemistry) as well as special spectroscopic features (e.g. blue and golden fluorescence or vibration energy transfer) into the proteins of living cells. In addition, his method allows the delivery of element-specific properties (fluorine, selenium and tellurium) into the biochemistry of life.

Ned Budisa is well known for the establishment of the use of selenium-containing non-canonical amino acids for protein X-ray crystallography and fluorine-containing analogs for 19F NMR-spectroscopy and protein folding studies. He was the first to demonstrate the use of genetic code engineering as a tool for the creation of therapeutic proteins and ribosomally synthesized peptide-drugs. He has succeeded with innovative engineering of biomaterials, in particular photoactivatable mussel-based underwater adhesives. Ned Budisa made seminal contributions to our understanding of the role of methionine oxidation in prion protein aggregation and has discovered the roles of proline side chain conformations (endo-exo isomerism) in translation, folding and stability of proteins.

Together with his co-worker Vladimir Kubyshkin, the new-to-nature hydrophobic polyproline-II helix foldamer was designed. Along with Budisa's previous work on bioexpression using proline analogues, the results of this project contributed to the establishment of the Alanine World hypothesis. It explains why nature chose the genetic code with "only" 20 canonical amino acids for ribosomal protein synthesis.

In 2015, the team led by Ned Budisa reported the successful completion of a long-term evolution experiment that resulted in full, proteome-wide substitution of all 20,899 tryptophan residues with thienopyrrole-alanine in the genetic code of the bacterium Escherichia coli. This is a solid basis for the evolution of life with alternative building blocks, foldamers or biochemistries. At the same time, this approach might be an interesting biosafety technology to evolve biocontained synthetic cells equipped with a "genetic firewall" which prevents their survival outside of man-made unnatural environments. Similar experiments with fluorinated tryptophan analogs as xenobiotic compounds (in collaboration with Beate Koksch from the Free University of Berlin) has led to the discovery of exceptional physiological plasticity in microbial cultures during adaptive laboratory evolution, making them potential environmentally friendly tools for new bioremediation strategies.

Ned Budisa is also actively involved in the debate of possible societal, ethical and philosophical impacts of radical genetic code engineering in the context of synthetic cells and life as well as technologies derived thereof.

Awards and honors (selection)

 2004: BioFuture Award
 2017: Publication Award Fluorine Chemistry

See also

 Bioconjugation
 Biocontainment
 Bioorthogonal chemistry
 Biosafety
 Biosecurity
 Biosignature
 Central dogma of molecular biology
 Directed evolution
 Expanded genetic code
 Genetic code
 Synthetic life
 Xenobiology

References

External links
 Homepage of the TU Berlin
 UniCat profile
 Talk about the future of Xenobiology
 General talk about Genetic Code Engineering
 Built-in drugs could target tissues
 Genetic Code 2.0 – 3 Synthetic Amino Acids Combined Into One Protein
 Oxidation sets off fatal structural change of human prion proteins
 iGEM.Berlin Magnetic e.Coli
 Professor and hobby boxer (article in german)
 A Super Adhesive Made from Intestinal Bacteria

Academic staff of the Technical University of Berlin
20th-century chemists
Croatian biochemists
Scientists from Zagreb
21st-century Croatian scientists
1966 births
Faculty of Science, University of Zagreb alumni
Scientists from Split, Croatia
People from Šibenik
People from Drniš
Living people